Army Bay is a northern coastal suburb of Auckland, New Zealand. It is on the Whangaparaoa Peninsula about 47 kilometres (by road) north of the city centre. It is named for the New Zealand Defence Force area north of Shakespear Regional Park. The military area was used to quarantine New Zealanders and Pacific Islanders evacuated from Wuhan during the COVID-19 pandemic in February 2020.

Demographics

Army Bay had a population of 1,566 at the 2018 New Zealand census, an increase of 156 people (11.1%) since the 2013 census, and an increase of 282 people (22.0%) since the 2006 census. There were 561 households, comprising 777 males and 786 females, giving a sex ratio of 0.99 males per female. The median age was 42.9 years (compared with 37.4 years nationally), with 306 people (19.5%) aged under 15 years, 243 (15.5%) aged 15 to 29, 726 (46.4%) aged 30 to 64, and 291 (18.6%) aged 65 or older.

Ethnicities were 91.4% European/Pākehā, 8.0% Māori, 3.3% Pacific peoples, 5.0% Asian, and 2.5% other ethnicities. People may identify with more than one ethnicity.

The percentage of people born overseas was 34.1, compared with 27.1% nationally.

Although some people chose not to answer the census's question about religious affiliation, 55.9% had no religion, 32.0% were Christian, 0.2% had Māori religious beliefs, 0.4% were Hindu, 0.2% were Muslim, 1.0% were Buddhist and 2.1% had other religions.

Of those at least 15 years old, 303 (24.0%) people had a bachelor's or higher degree, and 153 (12.1%) people had no formal qualifications. The median income was $38,000, compared with $31,800 nationally. 297 people (23.6%) earned over $70,000 compared to 17.2% nationally. The employment status of those at least 15 was that 618 (49.0%) people were employed full-time, 219 (17.4%) were part-time, and 39 (3.1%) were unemployed.

Notes

Populated places in the Auckland Region
Beaches of the Auckland Region
Hibiscus Coast